Thomas Attwood may refer to:

 Thomas Attwood (composer) (1765–1838), English composer and organist
 Thomas Attwood (economist) (1783–1856), British banker, economist, political campaigner and Member of Parliament
 Thomas Warr Attwood (c. 1733–1775), English builder, architect and local politician
 Thomas Attwood (Master of Gonville Hall) (died 1454), priest and academic

See also
 Thomas Atwood (disambiguation)
 Thomas Attwood Walmisley (1814–1856), English composer and organist